The Manatí River (Spanish: Río Grande de Manatí) is a river in Puerto Rico, which flows through several northern municipalities of the island. The river is named after the municipality of Manatí where the river mouth is located.

Description
The river travels in sequence through Barranquitas, the municipal boundaries of Orocovis, Corozal and Naranjito, Ciales, Morovis, Barceloneta and Manatí in Puerto Rico. The river flows into the Atlantic Ocean in the municipal boundary between Barceloneta and Manatí.

History
In the 1898 Military Notes on Puerto Rico by the U.S. it is written that the "Manatí River is bounded on the east 'south by the Sierra
Grande and on the west by the Siales ridge. It rises in the Sierra Grande, and parallel with the preceding river, it flows through Siales and Manatí, to the north of which latter town it empties into the Atlantic."

USACE project
In mid 2018, the United States Army Corps of Engineers announced it had earmarked $1.2 million to study and research the river.

Galleries

Corozal
View of Río Grande de Manatí from Puerto Rico Highway 802 Bridge in Corozal.

Morovis
View of Río Grande de Manatí in Río Grande barrio, near La Playita restaurant on PR-155.

Ciales
Views of Río Grande de Manatí from historic Manatí Bridge at Mata de Plátano in Ciales.

Manatí
View of Río Grande de Manatí from Puerto Rico Highway 642 Bridge in Manatí.

Barceloneta
View of Río Grande de Manatí in Barceloneta.

See also
 Manatí Bridge at Mata de Plátano: NRHP listing in Ciales, Puerto Rico
 List of rivers of Puerto Rico

References

External links
 USGS Hydrologic Unit Map – Caribbean Region (1974)
Ríos de Puerto Rico 

Rivers of Puerto Rico